Roland Sternisko (born April 10, 1988) is a German footballer who played in the 3. Liga for SpVgg Unterhaching.

External links

1988 births
Living people
German footballers
TSV 1860 Munich II players
SpVgg Unterhaching players
3. Liga players
Association football midfielders
Sportspeople from Würzburg
Footballers from Bavaria